The 20th Frontier Force is a battalion of the Frontier Force Regiment, a regiment of the Pakistan Army formed in 1956 from the amalgamation of three regiments: the Frontier Force Regiment, the Frontier Force Rifles, and the Pathan Regiment. The regimental center is at Abbottabad.

Establishment 
20 FF was established at Tobe camp Kakul on October 1, 1965, with Lieutenant Colonel Anwar ul Haq as its first Commanding Officer. 20 FF was converted to armored infantry by Lt. Colonel (later Brig.) Muneeb ur Rehman Farooqui.

Deployments 
The battalion took active part in the battles of 1965 and 1971.

Wartime Deployment 
1965 - Chawinda
1971 - Langewala

See also 
 United Nations Mission in Liberia
 Frontier Force Regiment

References

Frontier Force Regiment